Los Cerritos (sometimes called Los Cerritos/Virginia Country Club) is a neighborhood with approximately 700 homes and 2,000 residents located within the Bixby Knolls neighborhood of Long Beach, California. Established in 1906, the Los Cerritos neighborhood has been used by the film industry of Hollywood with its historic, estate-sized homes. It was one of three finalists in the 2007 Neighborhood of the Year national competition.

History
On October 7, 1906,  surrounding Rancho Los Cerritos were designated as the Los Cerritos subdivision. Once streets were cut out into the designed tract, the lots began to sell.

In 1920, Thomas Gilchrist, an Oklahoma oilman, purchased  along La Linda Drive and subdivided them into a development called La Linda, Spanish for "the pretty."  In 1929, 20th century architect Kirtland Cutter designed three award-winning homes in the Los Cerritos Neighborhood.  

Until 1961, the neighborhood was served by the Pacific Electric Long Beach Line.

Now one of Long Beach's oldest gated communities, the residential make-up of La Linda has changed. Many of the newer homes are larger.

In 2007, Los Cerritos Neighborhood was one of three finalists in Neighborhood USA's Neighborhood of the Year national competition in Baton Rouge, Louisiana.

Architecture

Movies and television
In 1985, a home on Country Club Drive in the Los Cerritos neighborhood was used as the Bueller family home in the 1986 comedy film Ferris Bueller's Day Off and subsequently used in the 2001 comedy film Not Another Teen Movie, the 2002 thriller film Red Dragon, and in a Cheerios commercial. In 1998, two homes on Cedar Avenue in the Los Cerritos neighborhood were used in the 1999 teen comedy film American Pie. In August 2000, another home on Country Club Drive was used as the fictional home for the teenager Donnie Darko in the 2001 drama/psychological thriller/science fiction film Donnie Darko.

Gallery

See also

 Daugherty Field
 Rancho Los Cerritos
 Neighborhoods of Long Beach, California

Notes

References
 Andriesse, (Summer 1987) "Los Cerritos: The Development of a Neighborhood," The Branded Word (newsletter of the Rancho Los Cerritos Historic Site).
 Knatz, Geraldine. (2004) History of the Los Cerritos neighborhood. (as noted in Preservation Honored.)
 Fugami, Caryn. (October 19, 2005) Long Beach Press-Telegram Morrison: Jewel of L.B. Section: News; page A12.

External links
 Los Cerritos Neighborhood homes used in noted films.

Houses in Long Beach, California
Neighborhoods in Long Beach, California
Populated places established in 1906
Tourist attractions in Long Beach, California
Kirtland Cutter buildings
Gated communities in California
1906 establishments in California